El Qoseir is a city in eastern Egypt, located on the Red Sea coast. Populated for approximately 5,000 years, its ancient name during the Ptolemaic era was Myos Hormos. Historically, it was the endpoint of the Wadi Hammamat trail, an important route connecting Egypt and the Red Sea. El Qoseir is located 138 kilometers south of Hurghada, 130 km north of Marsa Alam and 68 km north of the Marsa Alam International Airport. In 1986, its population was approximately 20,000. Today, the population of El Qoseir is around 50,000.

Climate 
Köppen-Geiger climate classification system classifies its climate as hot desert (BWh). Summers are hot and winters are warm. Winter night temperatures in El Qoseir, along with those of Marsa Alam and Sharm El Sheikh are the warmest of any other cities and resorts in Egypt. Additionally, Port Said, El Qoseir, Ras El Bar, Baltim, Damietta and Alexandria have the least temperature variation. Rain is very rare as in most of Egypt. Seasonal variation is small, comparable to Marsa Alam, but its summer days are cooler, even cooler than similar more northern areas at the Red Sea, like Hurghada and Sharm El Sheikh.

See also
Hurghada
Marsa Alam
Red Sea Riviera

Notes

References

External links
 Columbia Encyclopedia entry

Populated places in Red Sea Governorate
Underwater diving sites in Egypt